Timothy Lee Walberg (born April 12, 1951) is an American politician serving as the U.S. representative from  since 2023.

Early life, education, and early career
Walberg was born and raised in Chicago, Illinois, the son of Alice Ann and John A. Walberg. His paternal grandparents were Swedish. Walberg graduated from Thornton Fractional North High School in 1969.

Michigan legislature
Walberg was a member of the Michigan House of Representatives from 1983 to 1998. He also spent time as a pastor and as a division manager for the Moody Bible Institute in Chicago while continuing to live in Michigan.

U.S. House of Representatives

Elections
2004

After six years out of politics, Walberg ran in a field of six candidates in the 2004 Republican primary for the 7th District after six-term incumbent Nick Smith retired. Walberg finished third in the primary. State Senator Joe Schwarz won the primary and the general election.

2006

Walberg defeated Schwarz in the Republican primary. In the general election, he defeated Democratic nominee Sharon Renier, 50%–46%.

In 2007, there was a failed recall effort against Walberg.

2008

Entering the 2008 race, Democratic Congressional Campaign Committee chairman Chris Van Hollen identified Walberg as one of the most vulnerable Republican incumbents in Congress. On August 23, 2007, State Senate Minority Leader Mark Schauer announced he would challenge Walberg. The previous occupant of the seat, Joe Schwarz, who lost to Walberg in the 2006 Republican primary, declined to run but on September 30 endorsed Schauer.

Schauer narrowly defeated Walberg in the November election, 49% to 47%. Between the two candidates, around $3.5 million was spent on the campaign, making it one of the most expensive House races in the 2008 election. Schauer outspent Walberg by nearly $300,000.

2010

On July 14, 2009, Walberg announced that he would challenge incumbent Mark Schauer. He defeated Marvin Carlson and Brian Rooney in the Republican primary.

Polling showed the race as a dead heat. Walberg defeated Schauer, 50%–45%.

2012

Wahlberg defeated Democratic nominee Kurt Haskell, 53%–43%.

2014

Walberg defeated former Democratic State Representative Pam Byrnes with 54% of the vote.

2016

Walberg defeated Doug North in the August 2 Republican primary and Democratic nominee State Representative Gretchen Driskell in the general election, with 55% of the vote.

2018

Walberg defeated Driskell again, with 53.8% of the vote.

2020

Walberg defeated Driskell a third time, with 58.7% of the vote.

Committee assignments
 Committee on Education and the Workforce
 Subcommittee on Health, Employment, Labor, and Pensions (Ranking Member)
 Committee on Energy and Commerce
 Subcommittee on Communications and Technology
 Subcommittee on Energy

Caucus memberships
 Republican Study Committee
 House Baltic Caucus
Congressional Constitution Caucus

Political positions

Environment
Walberg rejects the scientific consensus on climate change. On the subject, he said in May 2017, "I believe that there is a creator in God who is much bigger than us. And I’m confident that, if there’s a real problem, he can take care of it."

Healthcare
Walberg has repeatedly voted to repeal the Patient Protection and Affordable Care Act. Walberg shares an office with Jackson Right to Life, which was vandalized by abortion rights activists in June 2022, just before the Dobbs v. Jackson Women's Health Organization decision. Fox News attributed the attack to the group Jane's Revenge.

Marriage
In 2015, Walberg cosponsored a resolution to amend the US constitution to ban same-sex marriage. Walberg also cosponsored a resolution disagreeing with the Supreme Court decision in Obergefell v. Hodges, which held that same-sex marriage bans violated the constitution.

Walberg voted against the "Respect for Marriage Act" codifying Loving v. Virginia and Obergefell v. Hodges, recognizing marriages across state lines regardless of "sex, race, ethnicity, or national origin of those individuals."

2008 presidential election
Walberg has repeatedly invoked birther conspiracy theories about President Barack Obama, arguing that Obama should have been impeached over his birth certificate.

2020 presidential election
In December 2020, Walberg was one of 126 Republican members of the House of Representatives to sign an amicus brief in support of Texas v. Pennsylvania, a lawsuit filed at the United States Supreme Court contesting the results of the 2020 presidential election, in which Joe Biden defeated incumbent Donald Trump. The Supreme Court declined to hear the case on the basis that Texas lacked standing under Article III of the Constitution to challenge the results of an election held by another state.

Electoral history
2004 election for the U.S. House of Representatives – 7th District Republican primary
 Joe Schwarz (R), 28%
 Brad Smith (R), 22%
 Tim Walberg (R), 18%
 Clark Bisbee (R), 14%
 Gene DeRossett (R), 11%
 Paul DeWeese (R), 7%

2006 election for the U.S. House of Representatives – 7th District Republican primary
 Tim Walberg (R), 33,144, 53%
 Joe Schwarz (R) (inc.), 29,349, 47%

2006 election for the U.S. House of Representatives – 7th District
 Tim Walberg (R), 49.93%
 Sharon Renier (D), 45.98%
 Robert Hutchinson (L), 1.55%
 David Horn (UST), 1.47%
 Joe Schwarz (write-in), 1.07%

2008 election for the U.S. House of Representatives – 7th District
 Mark Schauer (D), 48.79%
 Tim Walberg (R), 46.49%
 Lynn Meadows (G), 2.96%
 Ken Proctor (L), 1.76%

2010 election for the U.S. House of Representatives – 7th District
 Tim Walberg (R), 50.1%
 Mark Schauer (D), 45.4%
 Other, 4.5%

2012 election for the U.S. House of Representatives – 7th District
 Tim Walberg (R), 55.4%
 Kurt Haskell (D), 44.6%

Personal life
Walberg is an ordained pastor. Ordained as a Baptist, he currently identifies as nondenominational and attends a church affiliated with the Church of the United Brethren in Christ.

References

External links

 Congressman Tim Walberg official U.S. House website
 Campaign website
 
 
 

|-

|-

|-

|-

|-

1951 births
20th-century American politicians
21st-century American politicians
American people of German descent
American people of Norwegian descent
American people of Swedish descent
American Protestants
Christians from Michigan
Living people
Republican Party members of the Michigan House of Representatives
Moody Bible Institute alumni
People from Lenawee County, Michigan
Protestants from Michigan
Republican Party members of the United States House of Representatives from Michigan
Taylor University alumni
Tea Party movement activists
Wheaton College (Illinois) alumni